Kellyan Francisco García Leal (born 14 August 1998), simply known as Kellyan, is a Spanish footballer who plays as a goalkeeper for El Palo FC.

Club career
Born in Catral, Alicante, Valencian Community, Kellyan joined Málaga CF's youth setup in 2012, from Elche CF. He made his senior debut with the reserves on 13 September 2017, starting in a 3–0 Tercera División away defeat of CD Melistar.

On 7 September 2019, as starter Munir was on international duty, Kellyan made his first team debut by playing the full 90 minutes in a 0–1 home loss against UD Almería, in the Segunda División. The following 19 August, he renewed his contract until 2022 and was immediately loaned to Segunda División B side UD Ibiza for the campaign.

Kellyan was a backup to Germán Parreño as Ibiza achieved a first-ever promotion to the second division. On 7 August 2021, he signed for El Palo FC of the Tercera División RFEF.

References

External links
 
 
 

1998 births
Living people
People from Vega Baja del Segura
Sportspeople from the Province of Alicante
Footballers from the Valencian Community
Spanish footballers
Association football goalkeepers
Segunda División players
Segunda División B players
Tercera División players
Atlético Malagueño players
Málaga CF players
UD Ibiza players